Mountain is the debut album by American rock guitarist and vocalist Leslie West, released in July 1969 by Windfall Records.

Background 
Mountain is West's first solo album after several years spent as a member of the Vagrants. The album was recorded with bassist and producer Felix Pappalardi, who shortly after formed the band Mountain (named after the album) with West. As at least 5 of the tracks were subsequently played live by Mountain, this has mistakenly given it the reputation of being the band's first album.

Release and reception 

The album was released on LP in July 1969 by Windfall Records and in the UK on Bell Records. Reviewing for The Village Voice in September of that year, Robert Christgau wrote: "With Felix Pappalardi singing and playing bass regularly this could be New York's third supergroup. (The Rascals and the Spoonful got there first.) The visual possibilities alone—with West, the enormous ex-Vagrant guitarist, set against the hyperactive Pappalardi, are fantastic. West plays good guitar and is a good roarer, and Pappalardi is not only first-rate on several instruments but has a wonderful singing voice, sweet and mellow. Unfortunately, he hadn't decided to join the group when this was recorded, and so participates only as bassist and producer. West alone can't quite carry it. More like early Cream than Blind Faith."

On April 16, 1996, Columbia/Legacy reissued Mountain on CD. In a retrospective review, AllMusic's William Ruhlmann regarded it as a rock album "dominated by West's throaty roar of a voice and inventive blues-rock guitar playing", as well as "an auspicious debut, instantly establishing him as a guitar hero and setting the style of Mountain's subsequent recordings."

Track listing
 "Blood of the Sun" (Leslie West, Felix Pappalardi, Gail Collins) – 2:35
 "Long Red" (West, Pappalardi, John Ventura, Norman Landsberg) – 3:14
 "Better Watch Out" (Pappalardi, Collins) – 2:47
 "Blind Man" (Collins, Pappalardi, West, Ventura) – 3:50
 "Baby, I'm Down" (Pappalardi, Collins) – 3:58
 "Dreams of Milk and Honey" (West, Pappalardi, Ventura, Landsberg) – 3:22
 "Storyteller Man" (West, Pappalardi, Ventura, Landsberg) – 3:04
 "This Wheel's on Fire" (Bob Dylan, Rick Danko) – 3:18
 "Look to the Wind" (West, Pappalardi, Ventura) – 2:43
 "Southbound Train" (West, Ventura, Landsberg) – 2:57
 "Because You Are My Friend" (West) – 3:10

Personnel
Leslie West – guitars, vocals
Felix Pappalardi – bass, keyboards, production
N.D. Smart – drums

with:
Norman Landsberg – Hammond organ on "Long Red", "Storyteller Man" and "Southbound Train"

Additional personnel
 Bob D'Orleans – recording engineer
 Beverly Weinstein – art direction
 The Graffiteria/David Krieger – design
 Joel Brodsky – photography

References

External links 
 

1969 debut albums
Leslie West albums
Windfall Records albums